Tarista is a genus of moths of the family Erebidae. The genus was described by Schaus in 1913.

Species
Tarista albiapicalis Schaus, 1916 Panama, Peru
Tarista cacalis (Schaus, 1906) Brazil (São Paulo)
Tarista invida Dognin, 1914 Colombia
Tarista lycaon (H. Druce, 1891) Mexico, Guatemala
Tarista lydia (H. Druce, 1891) Guatemala, Costa Rica, Panama
Tarista morosa Schaus, 1913 Costa Rica
Tarista nigrirenalis (Guenée, 1854) Brazil (Rio de Janeiro)
Tarista ricalis (Schaus, 1906) Costa Rica
Tarista rufipalpis Schaus, 1913 Costa Rica
Tarista stolalis (Schaus, 1906) Mexico, Costa Rica

References

Herminiinae